Legislative elections were held in New Caledonia on 10 May 2009. Voters elected 76 members of the three provincial assemblies, of whom 54 were also to become members of the territorial Congress.

The Labour Party, which had been founded in 2007 as the political arm of the pro-independence Union of Kanaky Workers and the Exploited, contested the elections for the first time and hoped to gain 12,000 votes and a seat. Due to splits in the two main parties of the anti-independence front, the Rally–UMP and Future Together (from which Caledonia Together split off in October 2008), the main pro-independence party, the Kanak Socialist National Liberation Front (FLNKS), hoped to become the largest party in the elections.

Campaign
The newly elected Congress was to decide how to implement the autonomy provisions of the Noumea Accord of 1998. Apart from the island's political future, the economy and New Caledonia's high cost of living were the main issue in the election campaign.

Results

References

Elections in New Caledonia
New Caledonia
Legislative
New Caledonia